The Port of Mokha is among ancient and key ports of Yemen. It is located at the west of Taiz City.

History 
The port was established in 1955.

Location 
The Mokha Port is located in Mocha city, about 100 km west of Taiz and is 75 km away from Bab-el-Mandeb at the Red Sea coast. The port locates at the latitude 13/19º to the north of the equator and at the longitude 04/43º east of Greenwich line.

See also 

 Mokha

 Yemen Red Sea Ports Corporation
 Yemen Gulf of Aden Ports Corporation
 Yemen Arabian Sea Ports Corporation

References 

Ports and harbours of Yemen
Transport in Yemen
Government of Yemen